The following are the records of Colombia in Olympic weightlifting. Records are maintained in each weight class for the snatch lift, clean and jerk lift, and the total for both lifts by the Federacion Colombiana de Levantamiento de Pesas.

Current records

Men

Women

Historical records

Men (1998–2018)

Women (1998–2018)

References

External links

Colombia
records
Olympic weightlifting
weightlifting